Landmark Theatre may refer to:

Landmark Theatre, Devon, in North Devon, England
Landmark Theatre (Syracuse, New York), USA

See also
Landmark Theatres, American chain of movie theaters
Landmark Theater (Richmond, Virginia), now the Altria Theater